Crime Busters x 2 (simplified Chinese: 叮当神探) is a Singaporean Chinese drama which was telecasted on Singapore's free-to-air channel, MediaCorp Channel 8. It made its debut on 30 September 2008 and ended on 27 October 2008. This drama serial consists of 20 episodes, and was screened on every weekday night at 9:00 pm.

Cast

Main cast

Supporting cast

Synopsis
Xia Jingyi, nicknamed Xiaozhu ("Little Pig"), is a rookie cop with the Records Department of the Police Force and is constantly at loggerheads with her superior, Lü Daxiong. The aloof and temperamental Daxiong was transferred from the Criminal Investigation Department five years ago after a bungle during a police chase that resulted in the death of his partner.

Despite their differences, the duo helps in the investigation and solving of several cases; from the mystery of a man who died after a brush with a ghostly apparition, to the death of a reporter who was trying to uncover a child smuggling ring.

Yu Jie is a forensic pathologist with the CID. Her brother Yu Qing comes under investigation by the CID as he was tied to the death of a journalist threatening to expose the child smuggling syndicate he was believed to be a member of. Daxiong is secretly in love with Yu Jie but soon realises that she is hiding a deep dark secret about her past. While investigating the case he finds himself face to face one of his cold cases involving a mysterious criminal known as the "Surgical Maniac".

See also
List of programmes broadcast by Mediacorp Channel 8

External links
Official Website

Singapore Chinese dramas
2008 Singaporean television series debuts
Channel 8 (Singapore) original programming